Cordierite (mineralogy) or iolite (gemology) is a magnesium iron aluminium cyclosilicate. A high-temperature polymorph exists, indialite, which is isostructural with beryl and has a random distribution of Al in the  rings.

Name and discovery
Cordierite, which was discovered in 1813, in specimens from Níjar, Almería, Spain, is named after the French geologist Louis Cordier (1777–1861).

Occurrence
Cordierite typically occurs in contact or regional metamorphism of pelitic rocks. It is especially common in hornfels produced by contact metamorphism of pelitic rocks. Two common metamorphic mineral assemblages include sillimanite-cordierite-spinel and cordierite-spinel-plagioclase-orthopyroxene. Other associated minerals include garnet (cordierite-garnet-sillimanite gneisses) and anthophyllite. Cordierite also occurs in some granites, pegmatites, and norites in gabbroic magmas. Alteration products include mica, chlorite, and talc. Cordierite occurs, for example, in the granite contact zone at Geevor Tin Mine in Cornwall.

Commercial use
Catalytic converters are commonly made from ceramics containing a large proportion of synthetic cordierite. The manufacturing process deliberately aligns the cordierite crystals to make use of the very low thermal expansion along one axis. This prevents thermal shock cracking from taking place when the catalytic converter is used.

Gem variety

As the transparent variety iolite, it is often used as a gemstone. The name "iolite" comes from the Greek word for violet. Another old name is dichroite, a Greek word meaning "two-colored rock", a reference to cordierite's strong pleochroism. It has also been called "water-sapphire" and "Vikings' Compass" because of its usefulness in determining the direction of the sun on overcast days, the Vikings having used it for this purpose. This works by determining the direction of polarization of the sky overhead. Light scattered by air molecules is polarized, and the direction of the polarization is at right angles to a line to the sun, even when the sun's disk itself is obscured by dense fog or lies just below the horizon.

Gem quality iolite varies in color from sapphire blue to blue violet to yellowish gray to light blue as the light angle changes. Iolite is sometimes used as an inexpensive substitute for sapphire. It is much softer than sapphires and is abundantly found in Australia (Northern Territory), Brazil, Burma, Canada (Yellowknife area of the Northwest Territories), India, Madagascar, Namibia, Sri Lanka, Tanzania and the United States (Connecticut). The largest iolite crystal found weighed more than 24,000 carats (4,800g), and was discovered in Wyoming, US.

Another name for blue iolite is steinheilite, after Fabian Steinheil, the Russian military governor of Finland who observed that it was a different mineral from quartz. Praseolite is another iolite variety which results from heat treatment. It should not be confused with prasiolite.

See also
List of minerals
List of minerals named after people
Sunstone (medieval)

References

External links
Mineral galleries
https://www.gemstone.org/education/gem-by-gem/222-iolite

Magnesium minerals
Iron(II) minerals
Aluminium minerals
Cyclosilicates
Orthorhombic minerals
Minerals in space group 66
Gemstones